Kenneth P. Moritsugu (born March 5, 1945) is an American physician and public health administrator who was the first Asian American US Surgeon General.

Mortisugu was a rear admiral in the USPHSCC, who retired in September 2007 as acting United States Surgeon General. A third-generation Japanese-American, he was appointed the Deputy Surgeon General on October 1, 1998 and named acting Surgeon General on July 31, 2006.

Moritsugu received his bachelor's degree in 1967 from the University of Hawaiʻi at Mānoa, his Doctor of Medicine from the George Washington University School of Medicine in 1971, and a Master of Public Health (Health Administration and Planning) from the UC Berkeley School of Public Health in 1975.

He was the first Asian-American Surgeon General of the US.

He is Hospitaller Ambassador of the Order of Saint Lazarus.

Awards and decorations
Moritsugu has received awards and decorations from the USPHS, the Federal Bureau of Prisons, the United States Army, the Department of Defense and the United States Coast Guard. Among them are:

References

External links

1945 births
Living people
George Washington University School of Medicine & Health Sciences alumni
Surgeons General of the United States
University of Hawaiʻi at Mānoa alumni
UC Berkeley School of Public Health alumni
Hawaii Republicans
American military personnel of Japanese descent
American physicians of Japanese descent
Recipients of the Public Health Service Distinguished Service Medal